Pietro Paolo Pinto, O.F.M. Conv. (died 1661) was a Roman Catholic prelate who served as Bishop of Fondi (1640–1661). 

Pinto was ordained a priest in the Order of Friars Minor Conventual.
On 13 August 1640, he was appointed during the papacy of Pope Urban VIII as Bishop of Fondi.
He served as Bishop of Fondi until his death in September 1661.

References 

17th-century Italian Roman Catholic bishops
Bishops appointed by Pope Urban VIII
1661 deaths
Conventual Franciscan bishops